Cold Chillin' is the third EP from British hardcore punk band Your Demise. Released on 14 May 2013 in conjunction with Impericon and Pinky Swear Records, it is the first official work since the band split from Visible Noise Records.

Touring 
In February 2013, the band toured Europe in support of the album.

Critical reception 
Bring The Noise UK describes "Karma", the first video from the album as being "bittersweet lyrics and meth-like addictive chorus" that "contrasts greatly with the mainstream approaches that the 2012’s album took".

Track listing 
Karma - 3:20
A Song to No-One - 3:10
Nearly Home - 2:35
Just Like the End - 2:46
Everything That You Know - 2:32 
Footnote - 3:29
Sad but True - 4:49

References

External links 

2013 EPs
Your Demise albums